Kamak-e Khoda Rahem (also Romanized as Kamak-e Khodā Raḥem) is a village in Ludab Rural District, Ludab District, Boyer-Ahmad County, Kohgiluyeh and Boyer-Ahmad Province, Iran. At the 2006 census, its population was 32, in 6 families.

References 

Populated places in Boyer-Ahmad County